Juqin Rural District is in the Central District of Shahriar County, Tehran province, Iran. At the National Census of 2006, its population was 22,587 in 5,771 households. There were 23,075 inhabitants in 6,566 households at the following census of 2011. At the most recent census of 2016, the population of the rural district was 21,540 in 6,511 households. The largest of its 20 villages was Fararat, with 4,856 people.

References 

Shahriar County

Rural Districts of Tehran Province

Populated places in Tehran Province

Populated places in Shahriar County